Volumetric printing is a three-dimensional digital-to-physical imaging technology developed in 2013 that uses ink or other pigments suspended in a volume to form a full-color volumetric scene in physical space.  It is a static version of volumetric display.  Volumetric prints are auto-stereoscopic, full parallax (in both horizontal and vertical viewing arrangements) and can be viewed by multiple viewers in regular room lighting.  A volumetric print can be thought of as a reconstructed light field based on the scattering of light by distributed pigments in volume.  Any three-dimensional scene can be volumetrically printed, although biological specimens and volumetrically X-rayed objects (i.e., CT scans) are thought to be particularly well suited to this type of imaging.

Procedure
There are several methods for producing a volumetric print, the most common being an index-matched stack of hundreds of sheets of thin clear material (most often PMMA, also known as Lucite or acrylic).  Each sheet in the volumetric stack is printed with a color slice of a digital 3D model, placed in a vacuum chamber, and then injected with a fluid matching the index of refraction of the sheet material.

Volumetric printing has been called "Hologram 2.0" by a company marketing the technology. Volumetric prints however are not produced in the same manner as holograms, in that there is no interference pattern generated or used in basic volumetric prints.

References

External links
Confidential Printing & Document Printing
Advertising Technology For Digital Printing
What Is Vinyl, Inkjet Printing & UV Printing?

3D imaging
Emerging technologies
3D printing processes